The Joseph C. Hays House at 103-105 West Main Street in Sharpsburg, Maryland, United States was originally built in 1823 as a three-bay side hall double-parlor house in the Federal style. It was soon expanded to the east with a two-bay parlor and one commercial bay. The east parlor entered commercial use during the mid-19th century as a dry goods store operated by Benjamin F. Cronise.  Circa 1920 a storefront was added and a copper front was applied with BANK lettered under a central pediment, behind a marquee.

The property combines early 19th century Federal architecture with a good example of early 20th century commercial architectural ornament.

It was listed on the National Register of Historic Places in 2006.

Gallery

References

External links
, including photo in 2005, at Maryland Historical Trust

Federal architecture in Maryland
Houses in Washington County, Maryland
Houses on the National Register of Historic Places in Maryland
Sharpsburg, Maryland
National Register of Historic Places in Washington County, Maryland